Gagne and Gagné are two distinct French surnames. The name Gagné is more common in France. Gagne is also the name of three minor French rivers. People with these surnames include:

Gagne
Al Gagne (1941–2020), American curler
Greg Gagne (baseball) (born 1961), American baseball player
Greg Gagne (wrestler) (born 1948), American wrestler; son of Verne Gagne
Jacob Gagne (born 1993), American motorcycle racer
Jacqueline Gagne (born  1961), American golfer
Leslie Gagne (1908–?), Canadian ski jumper and Olympics competitor
Michaela Gagne (born 1982), American beauty pageant contestant and Miss Massachusetts 2006
Norman Gagne (1911–1986), Canadian ski jumper and Olympics competitor
Paulin Gagne (1808–1876), French poet, essayist, lawyer, politician, inventor, and eccentric
Pierre Gagne (born 1940), Canadian ice hockey player
Stéphane Gagne (born 1969), French sport shooter and Olympics competitor
Verne Gagne (1926–2015), American wrestler, wrestling trainer and promoter, and football player; father of wrestler Greg Gagne

Gagné
André Gagné (born ?), Canadian religious academic and researcher
Armand Gagné (1771–1792), French courtier, involuntary royal adoptee, and revolutionary
Art Gagné (1896–1988), Canadian ice hockey player
Cedric Gagné-Marcoux (born 1982), Canadian footballer
Don Gagné [see: Jean Gagné (below)]
Éric Gagné (born 1976), Canadian baseball player
France Gagné (born ?), Canadian discus and javelin thrower, shot putter, and Paralympic medalist
Gabriel Gagné (born 1996), Canadian ice hockey player
Jean Alfred Gagné (1842–1910), Canadian lawyer, merchant, judge, and politician
Jean Gagné (ringname: Don Gagné; 1947–2016), Canadian wrestler
Jocelyne Gagné (born ?), Canadian judge
Kevin Gagné (born 1992), Canadian ice hockey player
Kevin Régimbald-Gagné (born 1987), Canadian football player
Louis-Philippe Gagné (1900–1964), Canadian-born American journalist, political columnist, politician, and snowshoe enthusiast
Madame Gagné (1886–1891), Canadian portrait photograher
Malvina Gagné (1837–1920), Canadian educator, Ursuline nun, and monastery founder
Marie-Pierre Gagné (born 1983), Canadian synchronized swimmer and Olympics competitor
Michel Gagné (born 1965), Canadian cartoonist and animated film director
Paul Gagné (born 1962), Canadian ice hockey player and coach
Paul Gagné (translator) (born ?), Canadian translator
Philippe Gagné (born 1997), Canadian diver
Priscilla Gagné (born 1986), Canadian judoka and Paralympic medalist
Raphaël Gagné (born 1987), Canadian cross-country mountain biker
Raymonde Gagné (born 1956), Canadian politician and academic
Robert M. Gagné (1916–2002), American educational psychologist and theorist
Roméo Gagné (1905–1959), Canadian politician
Simon Gagné (born 1980), Canadian ice hockey player and Olympic medalist
Stéphane Gagné
Wayne Gagné (born 1964), Canadian ice hockey player

See also
Gagner (surname)
Gagnon (surname)
Gagny, Ivory Coast, a village sometimes spelled "Gagné"

French-language surnames